Pratylenchus pratensis is a plant pathogenic nematode.

References

External links 
 Nemaplex, University of California - Pratylenchus pratensis

pratensis
Plant pathogenic nematodes